The Kansas City Garment District is located in Downtown Kansas City, Missouri to the east of Quality Hill, across Broadway Boulevard. In the 1930s several large clothing manufacturers clustered here, making Kansas City's garment district second only to New York City's in size. Today, this heritage is commemorated by an oversize needle and thread monument. Its old industrial buildings have since been redeveloped into loft apartments, office, and restaurants. Henry Perry, father of Kansas City-style barbecue got his start in 1908 from a stand in an alley in the neighborhood.

References 

Neighborhoods in Kansas City, Missouri
Garment districts
Restaurant districts and streets in the United States
Downtown Kansas City